born  in Chiba Prefecture is a Japanese actor.

Hassei also appeared in 2004 film Oresama, alongside internationally recognised musician Miyavi.

He also portrayed Kurando Magira in the science fiction drama , and Kiyoi in the supernatural drama RH Plus.

He is married with Yukari Ishida (Reiko Fujimiya (née Yoshii) in Ultraman Gaia and Superior Ultraman 8 Brothers). They have a daughter named Hinaka. His family can be seen in Superior Ultraman 8 Brothers as they appear in this film as Hiroya, Reiko, and their daughter, respectively.

References

External links
Official profile 

1978 births
Japanese male actors
Actors from Chiba Prefecture
Living people